

Eardwulf was a medieval Bishop of Rochester.

Eardwulf was consecrated in 747. He died between 765 and 772. Between 759 and 765, King Sigeread of Kent granted land to Eardwulf and his clergy.

Citations

References

External links
 

Bishops of Rochester
8th-century English bishops